James Hilgendorf (born 29 March 1982 in Sydney, Australia) is a rugby union professional who plays for the Melbourne Rebels in the Super Rugby competition. His usual position is fly-half, but he can also play in the centres or at fullback.

Early career
Hilgendorf is a product of the Eastwood club in Sydney. He was an Australian Schoolboy representative in 2000, along with fellow Rebel Mark Gerrard. He made his Waratahs' debut in 2003.

He transferred to Western Force for the 2006 to 2008 Super Rugby seasons, then moved to Japan to play for the Kintetsu Liners, and later the Kobelco Steelers. In May 2010 Hilgendorf signed to join the Melbourne Rebels for the 2011 Super Rugby season. After short stints with both the Waratahs and Rebels in 2013, Hilgendorf retired after the Shute Shield final loss to Sydney University with his long term school mate Tim Davidson.

He now is an accredited RUPA Rugby Union Player Agent who works for The Blaze Agency Pty Ltd and rugby coach at The King's School, Parramatta.

References

External links
The Whole Force (TWF) Profile

1982 births
Living people
Australian rugby league players
Western Force players
Expatriate rugby union players in Japan
Melbourne Rebels players
Hanazono Kintetsu Liners players
Rugby Viadana players
Kobelco Kobe Steelers players
Taranaki rugby union players
Australian expatriate rugby union players
Australian expatriate sportspeople in Japan
Expatriate rugby union players in Italy
Australian expatriate sportspeople in Italy
Rugby league players from Sydney
Rugby union fly-halves
Australian rugby union players
Expatriate rugby union players in New Zealand
Perth Spirit players
New South Wales Waratahs players